Idia Renaissance is a non governmental civil society organization based in Edo State, Nigeria. The organization organize activities around human trafficking, including reception of victims of human trafficking. Idia Renaissance was founded by Mrs. Eki Igbinedion, wife of Chief Lucky Igbinedion, a former governor of Edo State. In 2021, Idia Renaissance partnered with the United Nations High Commissioner for Refugees (UNHCR) to create awareness on human trafficking and sexual exploitation of women girls.

History 
Idia Renaissance was founded on July 1, 1999 in Benin City, the capital of Edo State, Nigeria, as a counter-measure to address the trafficking of persons for sexual exploitation.

Partnership 
The organization partner with the following organizations/institution to achieve its objectives:
 United Nations International Children's Emergency Fund (UNICEF)
 National Agency For The Prohibition Of Trafficking In Persons (NAPTIP)
 International Organization for Migration (IOM)
 Swedish International Development Agency (SIDA)
 United Nations Office on Crime and Drugs (UNOCD)

References 

Organizations that combat human trafficking
Human rights organizations based in Nigeria
Organizations established in 1999
Nigeria
Human rights abuses in Nigeria
Crime in Nigeria
Women's rights in Nigeria